Sneakers (also called trainers, athletic shoes, tennis shoes, gym shoes, kicks, sport shoes, flats, running shoes, or runners) are shoes primarily designed for sports or other forms of physical exercise, but which are also widely used for everyday casual wear.

Since their popularization by companies such as Converse, Nike and Spalding in the mid 20th century, they have become attire, with variety growing in many global markets exponentially. Like other parts of the global clothing industry, manufacture of shoes is heavily concentrated in Asia with nine in ten shoes produced in that region.

Some companies are trying to substitute more sustainable materials in their manufacture. About 90% of shoes end up in landfills at end of life.

Names and etymology

The shoes have gone by a variety of names, depending on geography and changing over the decades. The term "sneakers" is most commonly used in Northeastern United States, Central and South Florida, Australia, New Zealand, and parts of Canada. However, in Australian, Canadian, and Scottish English, running shoes and runners are synonymous terms used to refer to sneakers; with the latter term also used in Hiberno-English. Tennis shoes is another term used in Australian, and North American English.

The British English equivalent of sneaker in its modern form is divided into two separate types - predominantly outdoor and fashionable trainers, training shoes or quality 'basketball shoes' and in contrast cheap rubber-soled, low cut and canvas-topped 'plimsolls'. In Geordie English, sneakers may also be called sandshoes, gym boots, or joggers; while plimsolls may be referred to as daps in Welsh English.

Several terms for sneakers exist in South Africa, including gym shoes, sports shoes and takkies. Other names for sneakers includes rubber shoes in Philippine English, track shoes in Singapore English, canvas shoes in Nigerian English, Camboo in Ghana English meaning Camp boot and sportex in Greece.

Plimsolls (British English) are "low-tech" athletic shoes and are also called "sneakers" in American English. The word "sneaker" is often attributed to American Henry Nelson McKinney, who was an advertising agent for N. W. Ayer & Son. In 1917, he used the term because the rubber sole made the shoe's wearer stealthy. The word was already in use at least as early as 1887, when the Boston Journal made reference to "sneakers" as "the name boys give to tennis shoes." The name "sneakers" originally referred to how quiet the rubber soles were on the ground, in contrast to noisy standard hard leather sole dress shoes. Someone wearing sneakers could "sneak up", while someone wearing standards could not.

Earlier, the name "sneaks" had been used by prison inmates to refer to warders because of the rubber-soled shoes they wore.

History

These shoes acquired the nickname 'plimsoll' in the 1870s, derived according to Nicholette Jones' book The Plimsoll Sensation, from the colored horizontal band joining the upper to the sole, which resembled the Plimsoll line on a ship's hull. Alternatively, just like the Plimsoll line on a ship, if water got above the line of the rubber sole, the wearer would get wet.

Plimsolls were widely worn by vacationers and also began to be worn by sportsmen on the tennis and croquet courts for their comfort. Special soles with engraved patterns to increase the surface grip of the shoe were developed, and these were ordered in bulk for the use of the British Army. Athletic shoes were increasingly used for leisure and outdoor activities at the turn of the 20th century - plimsolls were even found with the ill-fated Scott Antarctic expedition of 1911. Plimsolls were commonly worn by pupils in schools' physical education lessons in the UK from the 1950s until the early 1970s.

British company J.W. Foster and Sons designed and produced the first shoes designed for running in 1895; the shoes were spiked to allow for greater traction and speed. The company sold its high-quality handmade running shoes to athletes around the world, eventually receiving a contract for the manufacture of running shoes for the British team in the 1924 Summer Olympics. Harold Abrahams and Eric Liddell won the 100 m and 400 m events, kitted out with Foster's running gear.

This style of footwear also became prominent in America at the turn of the 20th century, where they were called 'sneakers'. In 1892, the U.S. Rubber Company introduced the first rubber-soled shoes in the country, sparking a surge in demand and production. The first basketball shoes were designed by Spalding as early as 1907. The market for sneakers grew after World War I, when sports and athletics increasingly became a way to demonstrate moral fiber and patriotism. The U.S. market for sneakers grew steadily as young boys lined up to buy sneakers endorsed by football player Jim Thorpe and Converse All Stars endorsed by basketball player Chuck Taylor.

During the interwar period, athletic shoes began to be marketed for different sports, and differentiated designs were made available for men. Athletic shoes were used by competing athletes at the Olympics, helping to popularise athletic shoes among the general public. In 1936, a French brand, Spring Court, marketed the first canvas tennis shoe featuring signature eight ventilation channels on a vulcanised natural rubber sole.

Adolf "Adi" Dassler began producing his own sports shoes in his mother's wash kitchen in Herzogenaurach, Bavaria, after his return from World War I, and went on to establish one of the leading athletic shoe manufacturers, Adidas. He also successfully marketed his shoes to athletes at the 1936 Summer Olympics, which helped cement his good reputation. Business boomed and the Dasslers were selling 200,000 pairs of shoes each year before World War II.

Post-War 

During the 1950s, leisure opportunities greatly expanded, and children and adolescents began to wear sneakers as school dress codes relaxed. Sneaker sales rose so high, they began to adversely affect the sales of conventional leather shoes, leading to a fierce advertising war for market share in the late '50s. In the 1970s, jogging for exercise became increasingly popular, and trainers designed specifically for comfort while jogging sold well. Companies also started to target some of their products at the casual fashion market. Soon, shoes were available for football, jogging, basketball, running, etc. Many sports had their relevant shoe, made possible by podiatrist development of athletic shoe technology.

During the 1990s, shoe companies perfected their fashion and marketing skills. Sports endorsements with famous athletes grew larger, and marketing budgets went through the roof. Sneakers became a fashion statement and were marketed as a definition of identity and personality rather than simply athletic aids.

Also during the 1990s, various vendors began producing "walking shoes" for adults using the construction technology of sneakers but visually resembling traditional leather shoes. The combination of a traditional look with increased comfort rapidly achieved wide popularity and by 2010 was displacing sales of leather shoes for adults in a parallel with the post-1950 success of sneakers among children. The shift was especially noticeable in combination with business-casual clothing.

From 1970 (five models), to 1998 (285 models), to 2012 (3,371), the number of sport shoe models in the U.S. has grown exponentially.

Use in sports

The term 'athletic shoes' is typically used for shoes utilized for jogging or road running and indoor sports such as basketball, but tends to exclude shoes for sports played on grass such as association football and rugby football, which are generally known in North America as "cleats" and in British English as "boots" or "studs".

Attributes of an athletic shoe include a flexible sole, appropriate tread for the function, and ability to absorb impact.  As the industry and designs have expanded, the term "athletic shoes" is based more on the design of the bottom of the shoe than the aesthetics of the top of the shoe. Today's designs include sandals, Mary Janes, and even elevated styles suitable for running, dancing, and jumping.

The shoes themselves are made of flexible compounds, typically featuring a sole made of dense rubber. While the original design was basic, manufacturers have since tailored athletic shoes for their specific purposes. An example of this is the spiked shoe developed for track running. Some of these shoes are made up to unusually large sizes for athletes with large feet.

Running shoes
Running shoes come in a range of shapes suited to different running styles/abilities. Generally, they are divided by running style: the majority are for heel-toe joggers/runners which are further subdivided into 'neutral', 'overpronation' and 'underpronation'. However, most evidence-based comparisons show no reduction in lower-limb running injuries from prescribing different types of shoe for different foot types. The shoes are constructed with a complex structure of "rubber" with plastic/metal stiffeners to restrict foot movement. More advanced runners tend to wear flatter and flexible shoes, which allow them to run more quickly with greater comfort.

According to the NPD Group, one in four pairs of running shoes that were sold in the United States in 2016 were bought from an online retailer.

Notable brands
, brands with global popularity include:

Types and number of models
 High-tops cover the ankle.
 Low-tops or oxfords do not cover the ankle.
 Mid-cut sneakers are in-between high-tops and low-tops.
 Sneaker boots extend to the calf.
 Slip-ons like low-tops/oxfords do not cover the ankle and do not have laces.
 Low-top CVO (Circular Vamp Oxford) like low-tops do not cover the ankle but unlike low-tops have a vamp in a circular form and typically four to five eyelets.
 High-top CVO (Circular Vamp Oxford) like high-tops cover the ankle and also have a circular vamp.

Culture 

Sneakers have been an important part of hip hop (primarily Pumas, Nike, and Adidas) and rock 'n roll (Converse, Vans) cultures since the 1970s. Hip hop artists sign million dollar deals with major brands such as Nike, Adidas, or Puma to promote their shoes. Sneaker collectors, called "sneakerheads", regard sneakers as fashionable items. Sneaker companies encourage this trend by producing rare sneakers in limited numbers, often at very high retail prices. Artistically-modified sneakers can sell for upwards of $1000 at exclusive establishments like Saks Fifth Avenue. In 2005, a documentary, Just for Kicks, about the sneaker phenomenon and history was released.

See also
 Biodegradable athletic footwear
 Comparison of orthotics
 List of shoe styles

References

External links 
 The Shoe in Sport
 

20th-century fashion
21st-century fashion
Athletic shoes
Footwear
History of clothing (Western fashion)
History of fashion
Shoes

pt:Tênis (vestuário)